Kamilla Stanislavovna Rakhimova (born 28 August 2001) is a Russian professional tennis player of Tatar descent.

She has career-high WTA rankings of No. 90 in singles, achieved on 22 August 2022, and No. 65 in doubles, attained on 6 June 2022. Up to date, she has won two doubles titles on the WTA Tour with one doubles title on the WTA Challenger Tour and eight singles and six doubles titles on the ITF Circuit.

Career

2019-2020: WTA Tour and major debut
Rakhimova made her WTA Tour debut at the 2019 Baltic Open, where she received a wildcard for the singles main draw.

She made her Grand Slam main-draw debut as a qualifier at the 2020 French Open, and defeated Shelby Rogers in the first round.

2021: US Open third round, two doubles titles, top 100
Despite losing to 11th seed Kristýna Plíšková, Rakhimova entered the US Open as a lucky loser by beating Lizette Cabrera, and Usue Maitane Arconada in the qualifying rounds. She then beat Kristina Mladenovic in the first round, swept 32nd seed Ekaterina Alexandrova aside (6-4, 6-1), before falling to eighth seed Barbora Krejčíková (4-6, 2-6). This was her first third-round showing at a Grand Slam championship in her career.

She won her second doubles title at the Upper Austria Ladies Linz, partnering Natela Dzalamidze. As a result, she moved 26 positions up into the top 70 in doubles, on 15 November 2021.

2023: Australian Open debut
She qualified for the 2023 Monterrey Open and she defeated sixth seed Katerina Siniakova in the first round. As a result she reached a new career-high ranking of No. 89 on 6 March 2023.

Performance timelines

Only main-draw results in WTA Tour, Grand Slam tournaments, Fed Cup/Billie Jean King Cup and Olympic Games are included in win–loss records.

Singles
Current after the 2023 Monterrey Open.

Doubles

WTA career finals

Doubles: 5 (2 titles, 3 runner-ups)

WTA Challenger finals

Doubles: 2 (1 title, 1 runner-up)

ITF Circuit finals

Singles: 11 (8 titles, 3 runner–ups)

Doubles: 9 (6 titles, 3 runner–ups)

Notes

References

External links
 
 

2001 births
Living people 
Russian female tennis players
Tennis players at the 2018 Summer Youth Olympics
Tatar people of Russia
Tatar sportspeople
Volga Tatar people